The Marriage of Lunatics Act 1811 was an Act of Parliament of the United Kingdom implemented under the reign of George III of Great Britain. It was intended "to prevent the marriage of Lunatics" and make all marriages to Lunatics prior to and after the bill, whether diagnosed before marriage or otherwise, "null and void to all intents and purposes whatsoever".

The Act reads as follows:

The Act was fully repealed in 2021 on the commencement of the Assisted Decision-Making (Capacity) Act 2015.

References 

Acts of the Parliament of the United Kingdom concerning Ireland
United Kingdom Acts of Parliament 1811
1811 in Ireland
Ableism
Marriage law in the United Kingdom
Disrupted marriage